

England vs India

New Zealand vs East Africa

England vs New Zealand

East Africa vs India

England vs East Africa

India vs New Zealand

References

External links
 Cricket World Cup 1975 from Cricinfo

A, 1975 Cricket World Cup